The Bridget Shea Three-Decker is a historic triple decker house in Worcester, Massachusetts.  Built c. 1888, the house was described as a well-preserved Queen Anne structure when it was listed on the National Register of Historic Places in 1990.  It has since lost many of its period details (see photo).

Description and history
The Bridget Shea Three-Decker is located in Worcester's southeastern Oak Hill neighborhood, at the northwest corner of Jefferson and Fox Streets.  It is a three-story wood frame structure, covered by a hip roof and finished modern siding.  The main facade is asymmetrical, with a projecting rectangular bay on the right side and the main entrance on the left.  The entrance is sheltered by an enclosed vestibule with a shed roof.  The right side bay houses two windows on the front face and single windows on the sides.  The second and third floors of the bay are separated by a flared skirt.

The house was built about 1888, during the early phase of development in the Oak Hill area.  Many of its period details, including corner braces and cut shingle sheathing, have been lost or obscured by subsequent siding work (see photo).  The early owners and tenants of the house were mainly Irish immigrants, who moved to this part of Worcester in large numbers in the late 19th century.  The Shea family, who were its first documented owners, included two machinists; other early residents included a weaver, watchman, and clerk.

See also
National Register of Historic Places listings in eastern Worcester, Massachusetts

References

Apartment buildings in Worcester, Massachusetts
Queen Anne architecture in Massachusetts
Houses completed in 1888
Triple-decker apartment houses
National Register of Historic Places in Worcester, Massachusetts
National Register of Historic Places in Worcester County, Massachusetts
Apartment buildings on the National Register of Historic Places in Massachusetts